Chasmocephalon is a genus of Australian araneomorph spiders in the family Anapidae, first described by O. Pickard-Cambridge in 1889.

Species
 it contains eight species:
Chasmocephalon acheron Platnick & Forster, 1989 – Australia (Victoria)
Chasmocephalon alfred Platnick & Forster, 1989 – Australia (Victoria)
Chasmocephalon eungella Platnick & Forster, 1989 – Australia (Queensland)
Chasmocephalon flinders Platnick & Forster, 1989 – Australia (Western Australia)
Chasmocephalon iluka Platnick & Forster, 1989 – Eastern Australia
Chasmocephalon neglectum O. Pickard-Cambridge, 1889 – Australia (Western Australia)
Chasmocephalon pemberton Platnick & Forster, 1989 – Australia (Western Australia)
Chasmocephalon tingle Platnick & Forster, 1989 – Australia (Western Australia)

References

Anapidae
Araneomorphae genera
Spiders of Australia